Belmont is an unincorporated community along Virginia State Route 114 in western Montgomery County, Virginia, in the United States. Belmont is derived from the French meaning "beautiful mount".

References

Unincorporated communities in Montgomery County, Virginia
Unincorporated communities in Virginia